Dynasty Cup was an East Asian international association football tournament. The tournament was held every 2 or 3 years. It was hosted by Beijing in 1990 and 1992, Hong Kong in 1995, Yokohama and Tokyo in 1998.

In 2002 the East Asian Football Federation was founded and in 2003 the East Asian Football Championship was established as successor tournament.

Results

Performance by nation

Summary

Most Valuable Players

Top scorers

See also
 East Asian Football Federation
 EAFF E-1 Football Championship

External links 
 RSSSF - Dynasty Cup

Defunct international association football competitions
Recurring sporting events established in 1990
Recurring events disestablished in 1998